Eric Lewis is the name of:
Eric Lewis (pianist) (born 1973), American jazz pianist
Eric Lewis (actor) (1855–1935), British actor
Eric Lewis (rugby league) (1909–1959), Australian rugby league footballer